The Amarillo version (or West Texas version) of the NWA World Tag Team Championship was the main tag team professional wrestling championship for the Amarillo, Texas-based Western States Sports promotion, a member of the National Wrestling Alliance (NWA). Promoters Doc Sarpolis and Dory Funk introduced the championship in 1955 and continued to use it as their main tag team championship until 1969. The NWA Board of Directors dictated that there would be only one NWA World Heavyweight Champion but allowed any NWA member, also known as a NWA territory, to create its own local version of the NWA World Tag Team Championship. In 1957 no less than 13 different versions of the NWA World Tag Team Championship were promoted across the United States. This even included another version in East Texas, which was used mainly in Houston and Fort Worth at the time.

To start the Amarillo lineage of the NWA World Tag Team Championship. Sarpolis and Funk invited Reggie Lisowski and Art Nelson, the holders of the Chicago version of the championship, to come to Amarillo and defend the championship. By November 1955 Lisowski stopped travelling to Amarillo so Nelson was given Rip Rogers as a partner, creating a separate lineage from the Chicago version as they continued to recognize Lisowski and Nelson as champions. The world tag team championship was actively promoted in and around Amarillo and Lubbock, Texas, from 1955 until March 1969. At that point the promotion abandoned the championship, opting to create the NWA Western States Tag Team Championship as the main tag team championship of the territory. Since the Amarillo version, like all other NWA World Tag Team Championships, were professional wrestling championships, it meant that the championship was not determined by competitive combat, but instead based on a predetermined match result.

The teams of Terry Funk and Dory Funk Jr., and Mike DiBiase and Danny Plechas, share the record for most reigns as a team, a total of three each. Art Nelson, one-half of the first championship team, held the title a total of eight times with various partners, the most of any individual. The Von Brauners' (Kurt Von Brauner and Karl Von Brauner) first reign lasted 140 days, the longest of any individual reign. The Von Brauners also hold the record for combined reigns as a team with a 166 days total for their two reigns. Individually, Nelson's eight reigns add up to at least 310 days, eclipsing any other wrestler. Due to incomplete records in regard to a number of championship changes, it is impossible to clearly identify the shortest reign; Great Bolo and Tokyo Joe's seven day reign in 1958 is the shortest confirmed reign.

Title history

Team reigns by combined length 
Key

Individual reigns by combined length 
Key

Tournaments

1957

1958

Footnotes

Concurrent championships 
Sources for 13 simultaneous NWA World Tag Team Championships
 NWA World Tag Team Championship (Los Angeles version)
 NWA World Tag Team Championship (San Francisco version)
 NWA World Tag Team Championship (Central States version)
 NWA World Tag Team Championship (Chicago version)
 NWA World Tag Team Championship (Buffalo Athletic Club version)
 NWA World Tag Team Championship (Georgia version)
 NWA World Tag Team Championship (Iowa/Nebraska version)
 NWA World Tag Team Championship (Indianapolis version)
 NWA World Tag Team Championship (Salt Lake Wrestling Club version)
 NWA World Tag Team Championship (Amarillo version)
 NWA World Tag Team Championship (Minneapolis version)
 NWA World Tag Team Championship (Texas version)
 NWA World Tag Team Championship (Mid-America version)

References 

National Wrestling Alliance championships
Tag team wrestling championships
Professional wrestling in Texas
Western States Sports championships
World professional wrestling championships